Friedrich Spanheim the Younger (1 May 1632 – 18 May 1701) was a German Calvinist theologian of conservative views, son of Friedrich Spanheim.

Life
He was born in Geneva, and studied at the University of Leiden, graduating M.A. in 1648. He joined the faculty of the University of Heidelberg in 1655.

In 1670 he moved to Leiden, replacing the late Johannes Cocceius as Professor of theology. Spanheim emphasised the study of church history. His theological position was expressed in dogmatic and polemical terms, as he took on Arminians, Cartesians, the followers of Cocceius and Jesuits. Spanheim encouraged the Voetians to stamp their orthodoxy on the Leiden theological faculty, and in 1676 pushed for the publication of 20 deprecated positions, marking out the Cocceian/Cartesian views. In the university Abraham Heidanus, Wittichius and Burchardus de Volder resisted strongly, and Heidanus lost his position. In the longer term, however, the Voetian victory was pyrrhic, in that Cartesianism quite soon prevailed.

Spanheim died in 1701 in Leiden.

Works
His collected works were published as Opera (1701–3).

Notes

1632 births
1701 deaths
17th-century Calvinist and Reformed theologians
17th-century German Protestant theologians
Dutch Calvinist and Reformed theologians
German Calvinist and Reformed theologians
Dutch librarians
German male non-fiction writers
Academic staff of Heidelberg University
Leiden University alumni
Academic staff of Leiden University
Theologians from the Republic of Geneva
17th-century German writers
17th-century German male writers